The Ordinaires was a nine piece experimental rock band from New York City. The band, which broke up in 1991, was composed of Angela Babin (guitar), Robin Casey (violin), Joe Dizney (guitar), Sven Furberg (bass), Kurt Hoffman (tenor saxophone), Barbara Schloss (violin), Jim Thomas (drums), Fritz Van Orden (alto saxophone), Garo Yellin (cello), and Peter Moffitt (cello, from 1984-1987).

Born as the early '80's New York no wave/noise movement began to take root, the band was both an outgrowth of and a reaction against the shapeless dissonance of their peers. Initially named Off-Beach, the band christened themselves The Ordinaires after completing two tracks for a Lower East Side compilation record. The name was a simplification of The Vin Ordinaires (based on the French term for table wine), and a pun on the name of band member Fritz Van Orden.

Their self-titled debut, recorded at New York's CBGB's, was released on the German Dossier label and was then released in America by Bar/None Records.

The Ordinaires are credited on the song "Kiss Me, Son Of God" by They Might Be Giants, and Kurt Hoffman would later be a part of They Might Be Giants' backing band.

Adam Duritz of the band Counting Crows is wearing a The Ordinaries shirt in the music video of their hit song Mr. Jones.

Discography

Albums
The Ordinaires - LP (1986, Dossier Records)
One - LP/Cassette (1989, Bar/None Records)

Compilation Appearances
Peripheral Vision - "Bands of Loisaida" - Cassette (1982, Zoar Records)
Island of Sanity - "New Music From New York" - LP (1987, Rec-Rec Records)
Time For A Change (1989, Bar/None Records)1989 - Time For A Change (Bar/None Records compilation)

Notes

External links
 The Ordinaires: They Might Be Giants Knowledge Base
 Bar/None Records overview

American noise rock music groups
American experimental rock groups
Musical groups disestablished in 1991
Musical groups from New York City